William Davison may refer to:
William Davison (diplomat) (c. 1541–1608), secretary to Queen Elizabeth I
William Davison (publisher) (1781–1858) of Alnwick, British printer and publisher
William Davison, 1st Baron Broughshane (1872–1953), British peer and Conservative Member of Parliament
William Ruxton Davison (died 1893), British ornithologist and collector
Will Davison (born 1982), Australian racing driver
Bill Davison (1906–1989), jazz musician

See also
William Davidson (disambiguation)